Burrelles provides media relations  planning, monitoring, and measurement services.

History
Founded in 1888 by Frank Burrelle and Robert Luce, BurrellesLuce, now Burrelles, is one of the leading media monitoring service providers in the United States. This company's CEO is Charles Waggoner and Chairman of the Board is Robert C. Waggoner. Burrelles is headquartered in Florham Park, New Jersey, and has offices throughout the United States.

Timeline 
 In 1888, Burrelle's Press Clipping Bureau was founded by Frank Burrelle in New York City. Around the same time, Robert Luce founded Luce Press Clippings in Boston.
 In 1935, Burrelle's achieved national newspaper coverage.
 In 1940, Burrelle's achieved magazine coverage.
 In 1951, Southwest Clippings—operated by the French family—purchased Luce Press Clippings from Harvard.
 In 1960, Burrelle's Press Clipping Bureau became Burrelle's Information Services.
 In 1970, Burrelle's achieved broadcast and wire service coverage.
 In 1984, Burrelle's created Express to send the day's headlines and brief news summaries to executives via fax machine.
 In 1994, Burrelle's introduced NewsAlert, an online media monitoring service.
 In 2003, Burrelle's Information Service and Luce Press Clippings merged, forming what was known as BurrellesLuce.
 In 2007, BurrellesLuce introduced a new web portal called BurrellesLuce 2.0.
 In 2010, BurrellesLuce introduced BurrellesLuce WorkFlow™, now MYNEWSDASH, its media outreach, monitoring, and analytics service portal.
 In 2012, BurrellesLuce acquired the U.S. print monitoring operations of Cision and becomes the only media monitoring service to provide print coverage.
 In 2019, BurrellesLuce rebrands as Burrelles and launched a significantly expanded portfolio of products and services.

Products and services
Burrelles provides communications professionals with a connection to their media data. The company's suite of services includes media monitoring, media outreach, customized reporting, analytical research, publishing, data services, and professional services.

References

External links
 

Florham Park, New Jersey
Media analysis organizations and websites
News aggregators